The Men's 500 metres competition at the 2021 World Single Distances Speed Skating Championships was held on 12 February 2021.

Results
The race was started at 16:17.

References

Men's 500 metres